Pyotr Alexandrovich Smirnov (29 May 1897 – 23 February 1939) was a Soviet commissar, deputy minister of defence, and commander of the Soviet Navy.

Biography
Smirnov was born in a workers family in a village near Vyatka in 1897. He finished school and worked as a smith in a timber mill from 1913. He joined the Bolsheviks in March 1917 and was a member of the Red Guards. He fought in the Civil War ending as a brigade commander and a political officer of an army. In 1921 he took part in the suppression of the Kronstadt rebellion.

In the 1920s he was a political commissar of the Volga and North Caucasus military districts. From 1926 he joined the political directorate of the armed forces and was political commissar of the Baltic Fleet and Military districts.

In 1937 he was involved in the purge of military leaders including Yakov Gamarnik. In October 1937 he became deputy minister of defence, and was commander of the Soviet Navy from December 1937.

Repression
He was arrested in June 1938 and executed by firing squad in February 1939. He was rehabilitated in 1956.

Awards
 The order of Lenin;
 Order of the Red Banner (1921).

References 

1897 births
1939 deaths
People from Slobodskoy Uyezd
Old Bolsheviks
First convocation members of the Supreme Soviet of the Soviet Union
NKVD officers
Soviet Navy personnel
Recipients of the Order of Lenin
Recipients of the Order of the Red Banner
People of the Russian Civil War
Great Purge victims from Russia
Russian people executed by the Soviet Union
Soviet rehabilitations